Lee Archer may refer to:

 Lee Archer (pilot) (1919–2010), a Tuskegee Airman in the U.S. Army Air Corps during World War II
 Lee Archer (footballer) (born 1972), English former professional footballer
 John Lee Archer (1791–1852), architect and engineer